Trevor Herriot,  is a Canadian naturalist and writer; he is best known as a bird expert.

Herriot's work can be seen in major publications, including Canadian Geographic and The Globe & Mail. He has also written several books, and received many awards, including the Cheryl and Henry Kloppenburg Award for Literary Excellence.

Herriot regularly provides media commentary on the topics of nature and environmental issues. Such commentary includes a regular call-in segment on Blue Sky, a regional CBC Radio program in Saskatchewan.

Personal life
Herriot lives in Regina, Saskatchewan.

Recognition

Awards
In 2017, Herriot was awarded the Cheryl and Henry Kloppenburg Award for Literary Excellence, awarded for his body of acclaimed literary work.

Herriot's first book, River in a Dry Land: A Prairie Passage, won the following awards:

 Drainie-Taylor Biography Prize; 
 the Canadian Booksellers Association's Libris Award for Best First-Time Author; 
 the Saskatchewan Book of the Year Award; and
 the Regina Book Award.

Herriot's second book, Grass, Sky, Song: Promise and Peril in the World of Grassland Birds, was shortlisted for the 2009 Governor General's Awards.

River in a Dry Land: A Prairie Passage was shortlisted for the Governor General's Award for English-language non-fiction at the 2000 Governor General's Awards.

In 2022, Herriot was awarded the Saskatchewan Order of Merit.

Media
Herriot has a media presence. He has been featured in news outlets, published books, and appeared on broadcasts.

News
Herriot has been featured on:

 National news outlets (e.g., CBC);
 Urban news outlets (e.g., Edmonton Journal); and
 Local news outlets.

Books
Herriot's writing frequently delves into the spiritual aspects of connecting with the natural world.

He has authored or co-authored the following books:
2000. River in a Dry Land: A Prairie Passage.
2009. Grass, Sky, Song: Promise and Peril in the World of Grassland Birds. 
2011. Jacob's Wound: A Search for the Spirit of Wildness.
2014. The Road Is How: A Prairie Pilgrimage through Nature, Desire.
2016. Towards a Prairie Atonement  by Trevor Herriot and afterword by Norman Fleury.
2017. Islands of Grass.
2021. Backyard Bird Feeding: A Saskatchewan Guide  by Trevor Herriot and Myrna Pearman.

Notable works
 Towards a Prairie Atonement received some coverage in the Regina Leader Post.
Backyard Bird Feeding: A Saskatchewan Guide revived some coverage in The Western Producer, a local publication.
"Well-known writer and naturalist Trevor Herriot provided the Saskatchewan perspective to Myrna Pearman’s work. The combined knowledge, experience and talents of these two writers and bird lovers has resulted in a beautiful, engaging and informative handbook."

Broadcasts
 2021. CBC Radio, Birdline with Trevor Herriot and Myrna Pearman.

References

Living people
21st-century Canadian non-fiction writers
Canadian nature writers
Canadian spiritual writers
Canadian magazine writers
Canadian naturalists
Writers from Regina, Saskatchewan
Canadian radio personalities
Year of birth missing (living people)
21st-century Canadian male writers
Canadian male non-fiction writers